Haji Ghulam Ali is a Pakistani politician and a member of Jamiat Ulema-e-Islam (F) who is currently serving as the 34th Governor of Khyber Pakhtunkhwa in office since 23 November 2022. He has previously served as the Mayor of Peshawar for more than 3 years and as a member of the Senate from 2009 to 2015, for 6 years.

Political career
In March 2009 he was elected to the Senate of Pakistan on general seat as Jameet Ulema Islam (F) candidate. He is the chairperson of senate committee on Commerce and Textile Industry, and member: committee of States and Frontier Regions, Inter-Provincial Coordination and Parliamentary Affairs.
His son Fayaz Ali is Son In Law of Jamiat Ulema-e-Islam Leader Fazal-ur-Rehman (politician) while his other son Zubair Ali is Mayor Peshawar City.

See also
 List of Senators of Pakistan
 Ayatullah Durrani
 Hafiz Hamdullah

References

Living people
Pashtun people
Jamiat Ulema-e-Islam (F) politicians
Members of the Senate of Pakistan
Year of birth missing (living people)
Mayors of Peshawar